Habenaria medusa is a species of orchid endemic to Java, Sumatra, Sulawesi and Borneo.

References

External links
 IPNI Listing

medusa